Super Ma'am (International title: My Teacher, My Hero) is a Philippine television drama action fantasy series broadcast by GMA Network. Directed by Lord Alvin Madridejos and Albert Langitan, it stars Marian Rivera in the title role. It premiered on September 18, 2017 on the network's Telebabad line up replacing Alyas Robin Hood. The series concluded on January 26, 2018 with a total of 95 episodes. It was replaced by Sherlock Jr. in its timeslot.

Originally titled as The Good Teacher, it was later renamed to Super Ma'am. The series is streaming online on YouTube.

Premise
Minerva Henerala, a high-school teacher, lost her mother and sister to an archaeological accident many years ago. She had an encounter with winged creatures and shape shifters called Tamawo. Throughout the years, the Tamawo have made their way into the city and abduct children to feed on their energy. Minerva becomes "Super Ma'am", a Tamawo hunter, and saves the human world from them.

Cast and characters

Lead cast
 Marian Rivera as Minerva Henerala / Super Ma'am

Supporting cast
 Helen Gamboa as Lolita Honorio
 Kim Domingo as Avenir Segovia / Mabelle Henerala / Vera
 Joyce Ching as Dalikmata / Dolly
 Kristofer Martin as Aceron "Ace" Mendoza / Lakandayo
 Jerald Napoles as Esteban "Teban" Magbanua
 Jillian Ward as Michelle Ombrero
 Jackie Lou Blanco as Greta Segovia
 Matthias Rhoads as Trevor Jones
 Al Tantay as Chaplin Henerala
 Ashley Ortega as Kristy Garcia / Maureen
 Meg Imperial as Jessica Montesa
 Kevin Santos as Casper
 Shyr Valdez as Lailani 
 Enrico Cuenca as Jake
 Julius Miguel as Bixby Henerala
 Isabella de Leon as Rafa
 Ashley Rivera as Rose
 Vincent Magbanua as Eric Gumatay
 Andrew Gan as Keno
 Marika Sasaki as Dina
 Ralph Noriega as Onin Cortez

Guest cast
 Ai-Ai delas Alas as Barbie
 Dina Bonnevie as Raquel Honorio-Henerala
 Carmina Villarroel as Ceres
 Elijah Alejo as young Minerva
 Sofia Pablo as young Mabelle
 Barbara Miguel as young Jessica
 Rafa Siguion-Reyna as Samuel
 Zackie Rivera as Isay
 Richard Quan as Gorio
 Mark Andaya as Pido
 Tonio Quiazon as Arlan
 Ivan Dorschner as Isko Dagohoy
 Conan Stevens as Baraka
 Jeric Gonzales as Isagani Dagohoy
  as Katrina "Katitay" Magbanua
 Lucho Ayala as Adonis
 Shermaine Santiago as Linda 
 Diana Zubiri as Gilda "Jill" Magpantay
 Epi Quizon as Jacqueline "Jack" Magpantay
 Divine Tetay as Wendy "Wen" Magpantay
 Jade Lopez as Vicky Cortez
 Lia Valentin as Rosa
 Ermie Concepcion as Tale
 Neil Ryan Sese as Arjay
 Rita Avila as Lorenza Diaz
 John Kenneth as Justin Ombrero
 Liezel Lopez as Sonia
 Toby Alejar as Frankenstein
 Gil Cuerva as Xavier
 Patricia Tumulak as Black Super Ma'am
 Boobay as Lovely
 Barbie Forteza as Pearly
 Addy Raj as Christian
 Joanna Katanyag as Celeste
 Ayeesha Cervantes as Wendy
 Ces Aldaba as Lolong
 Beki Belo as Mema Sirena
 Andrea del Rosario as Azravach
 Arny Ross as Serpentina
 Jazz Ocampo as Mamba
 Ameera Johara as Pythona
 Victor Neri as Agalon
 Jak Roberto as Isidro "Sidro" Dagohoy

Ratings
According to AGB Nielsen Philippines' Nationwide Urban Television Audience Measurement People in Television Homes, the pilot episode of Super Ma'am earned a 9.5% rating. While the final episode scored a 10.7% rating. The series had its highest rating on November 24, 2017 with an 11.1% rating.

References

External links
 
 

2017 Philippine television series debuts
2018 Philippine television series endings
Fantaserye and telefantasya
Filipino-language television shows
GMA Network drama series
Philippine action television series
Television shows set in the Philippines